Omar Johnson (born 25 November 1988) is a Jamaican sprinter. He competed in the 4x400 metres relay event at the 2013 World Championships in Athletics, winning a silver medal.

References

1988 births
Living people
Jamaican male sprinters
Place of birth missing (living people)
Athletes (track and field) at the 2014 Commonwealth Games
World Athletics Championships athletes for Jamaica
Commonwealth Games competitors for Jamaica
21st-century Jamaican people